The Helotiales are an order of fungi in the phylum Ascomycota. Many species are plant pathogens. The following list of Helotiales genera have not been placed with any certainty (incertae sedis) into a family.

 Acidea  – 1 sp.
 Acidomelania  – 1 sp.
 Algincola  – 1 sp.
 Amylocarpus  – 1 sp.
 Angelina  – 1 sp.
 Aphanodesmium  – 1 sp.
 Apiculospora  – 1 sp.
 Aquadiscula  – 2 spp.
 Aquapoterium  – 1 sp.
 Ascluella  – 1 sp.
 Ascoclavulina  – 8 spp.
 Banksiamyces  – 4 spp.
 Belonioscyphella  – 4 spp.
 Benguetia  – 1 sp.
 Bioscypha  – 2 spp.
 Brachyalara  – 1 sp.
 Brefeldochium  – 1 sp.
 Bulgariella  – 4 spp.
 Bulgariopsis  – 2 spp.
 Calycellinopsis  – 1 sp.
 Capillipes  – 1 sp.
 Capricola  – 1 sp.
 Cashiella  – 3 spp.
 Cejpia  – 3 spp.
 Cenangiumella  – 1 sp.
 Chloroepilichen  – 1 sp.
 Chlorospleniella  – 1 sp.
 Chondroderris  – 1 sp.
 Ciliella  – 1 sp.
 Cistella  – 50 spp.
 Clathrosporium  – 1 sp.
 Coleosperma  – 1 sp.
 Colipila  – 2 spp.
 Comesia  – 3 spp.
 Cornuntum  – 1 sp.
 Coronellaria  – 4 spp.
 Criserosphaeria  – 1 sp.
 Crocicreas  – 4 spp.
 Crucellisporium  – 3 spp.
 Crumenella  – 1 sp.
 Cryptohymenium  – 1 sp.
 Cryptopezia  – 1 sp.
 Dactylaria  – 100)
 Dawsicola  – 1 sp.
 Dermateopsis  – 2 spp.
 Didonia  – 5 spp.
 Didymascella  – 5 spp.
 Discomycella  – 1 sp.
 Durella  – 22 spp.
 Echinodiscus  – 2 spp.
 Encoeliopsis  – 4 spp.
 Episclerotium  – 2 spp.
 Erikssonopsis  – 1 sp.
 Fulvoflamma  – 1 sp.
 Gloeopeziza  – 8 spp.
 Godroniopsis  – 3 spp.
 Gorgoniceps  – 3 spp.
 Grimmicola  – 1 sp.
 Grovesia  – 1 sp.
 Hemiglossum  – 2 spp.
 Humicolopsis  – 2 spp.
 Hydrocina  – 1 sp.
 Hymenobolus  – 3 spp.
 Hyphoscypha  – 1 sp.
 Hysteronaevia  – 12 spp.
 Hysteropezizella  – 26 spp.
 Hysterostegiella  – 10 spp.
 Infundichalara  – 2 spp.
 Involucroscypha  – 10 spp.
 Jacobsonia  – 1 sp.
 Korfia  – 1 sp.
 Larissia  – 1 sp.
 Lasseria  – 1 sp.
 Lemalis  – 3 spp.
 Libartania  – 2 spp.
 Livia  – 1 sp.
 Masseea  – 4 spp.
 Melanopeziza  – 1 sp.
 Merodontis  – 1 sp.
 Microdiscus  – 1 sp.
 Mitrulinia  – 1 sp.
 Monochaetiellopsis  – 2 spp.
 Mycosphaerangium  – 3 spp.
 Obconicum  – 2 spp.
 Obscurodiscus  – 1 sp.
 Orbiliopsis  – 2 spp.
 Otwaya  – 12 spp.
 Pachydisca  – 32 spp.
 Parencoelia  – 4 spp.
 Patinellaria  – 1 sp.
 Peltigeromyces  – 3 spp.
 Pestalopezia  – 3 spp.
 Pezolepis  – 2 spp.
 Pezomela  – 1 sp.
 Phacidiella  – 1 sp.
 Phaeofabraea  – 1 sp.
 Phaeopyxis  – 1 sp.
 Phragmonaevia  – 16 spp.
 Piceomphale  – 1 sp.
 Pleoscutula  – 3 spp.
 Podophacidium  – 2 spp.
 Polydesmia  – 7 spp.
 Polyphilus  – 2 spp.
 Populomyces  – 1 sp.
 Potridiscus  – 1 sp.
 Pseudohelotium  – 50 spp.
 Pseudolachnum  – 1 sp.
 Pseudomitrula  – 1 sp.
 Pseudopeltis  – 1 sp.
 Pseudotryblidium  – 1 sp.
 Psilophana  – 1 sp.
 Pteromyces  – 1 sp.
 Pubigera  – 1 sp.
 Radotinea  – 1 sp.
 Rhexocercosporidium  – 2 spp.
 Rhizocladosporium  – 1 sp.
 Rhizothyrium  – 1 sp.
 Rommelaarsia  – 1 sp.
 Roseodiscus  – 4 spp.
 Sageria  – 1 sp.
 Sambucina  – 1 sp.
 Sarcomyces  – 1 sp.
 Sclerocrana  – 4 spp.
 Scutulopsis  – 1 sp.
 Soosiella  – 1 sp.
 Sorokina  – 1 sp.
 Sorokinella  – 2 spp.
 Spirosphaera  – 8 spp.
 Stamnaria  – 7 spp.
 Stilbopeziza  – 1 sp.
 Strossmayeria  – 20 spp.
 Tetracladium  – 10 spp.
 Thedgonia  – 6 spp.
 Themisia  – 8 spp.
 Tovariella  – 1 sp.
 Trichohelotium  – 2 spp.
 Triposporium  – 14 spp.
 Unguicularia  – 7 spp.
 Urceolella  – 44)
 Vandijckella  – 1 sp.
 Waltonia  – 1 sp.
 Woodiella  – 3 spp.
 Xeromedulla  – 3 spp.
 Zugazaea  – 1 sp.

References

Genera
Fungal plant pathogens and diseases
Ascomycota enigmatic taxa
Lists of fungi genera (alphabetic)